Monwar is a surname. Notable people with the surname include:
 Mostafa Monwar, Bangladeshi actor, writer, and screenwriter
 Mustafa Monwar (born 1935), Bangladeshi artist